Randwick Army Barracks  is a military base in Sydney, Australia. It is the base for a number of support and Australian Army Reserve units.

List of units
1st Division

 39th Operational Support Battalion

2nd Division
 Headquarters, 2nd Division
 8th Signal Regiment (HQ at Randwick Barracks, NSW)
6th Brigade
 19th Chief Engineer Works

17th Sustainment Brigade 
 Headquarters, 17th Sustainment Brigade
 Headquarters, 1st Psychology Unit and 1st Health Support Company (Randwick Barracks, NSW)
1st Commando Regiment (1 Cdo Regt)
Regimental Headquarters (1 Cdo Regt)
301st Signal Squadron (1 Cdo Regt)

References

Special forces of Australia
Barracks in Australia
Military installations in New South Wales
Buildings of the Australian government